George Anthony Visger (born September 26, 1958) is a former professional American football player who played defensive line for the San Francisco 49ers.

Early life

Visger began playing Pop Warner football at age 11 for the West Stockton Bear Cubs. At age 13, during his 3rd year of Pop Warner, he was hospitalized after knocking himself out in a Bull-In-The-Ring drill. After winning two championships in Pop Warner, he went on to play at A.A. Stagg High in Stockton, CA where they won two championships and went 20-1-1 including  11-0 and ranked #3 in CA during his two years on the varsity. Visger was selected to the 1975 Top 100 High School All-American team.

From 1976-1979, Visger attended the University of Colorado on a football scholarship, where he majored in Fisheries Biology and made the traveling squad as a true freshman. Under head coach Bill Mallory, Colorado won the 1976 Big Eight Championship and played Ohio State in the 1977 Orange Bowl. Visger was a three-year starter earning honorable mention All Big Eight and The Regiment Award in 1979.

Two weeks before the 1980 draft, Visger unknowingly fractured his sacral 8 vertebrae and played his entire rookie season with a broken back.

Career

Early career

In 1980, Visger was selected by the New York Jets in the 6th round of the NFL draft, ultimately playing with the San Francisco 49ers in 1980 and 1981. Visger sustained a major concussion in the first quarter of a Dallas game in 1980, yet played the entire game by clearing his head with smelling salts each time he came off the field.

Early in the following 1981 season, Visger underwent his first knee surgery. Several weeks later, he developed hydrocephalus from concussions and underwent emergency VP shunt brain surgery. Four months after their Super Bowl XVI victory, Visger underwent two additional brain surgeries 10 hours apart and was given last rites. In 1984, he required two additional knee surgeries, including an experimental Gore-Tex ACL transplant to repair damage sustained during the 1981 season.

Visger returned to school to complete his Biology degree in 1986. He survived five additional emergency VP Shunt brain surgeries and several gran mal seizures in 1987, while enrolled in Chemistry and Physics courses and earning a Class B General Contractor’s license. In 1990, he graduated with a Bachelor of Science degree in Biological Conservation, despite developing dyslexia and major short-term memory deficits from his surgeries and seizure medications. Visger began his career as a wildlife biologist/environmental consultant in 1990 and has now survived nine emergency VP shunt brain surgeries.

Post career

Visger has become a well-known expert on traumatic brain injuries (TBI). In 2010, he founded The Visger Group, a TBI consulting organization with the goal of raising the awareness of TBI in a variety of venues, including football, injured military veterans, and pediatric groups. He has presented at numerous brain injury recovery conferences throughout the country and coordinates with hospital TBI recovery programs, the California School Nurses Organization, and the Wells Fargo Play It Safe Concussion Care Program.

Visger has been featured on NPR, CNN, CBS Evening News, ESPN Outside The Lines, Slate Magazine, and specials in London, England, and Rio de Janeiro, Brazil. He consults directly with Dr. Rich Ellenbogen of the NFL Head, Neck, and Spine Injury Group on rule changes to reduce TBI in football. Many of Visger’s suggestions have been implemented to date.

Visger has recommended NFL rule changes to address the issue.

Visger also conducts motivational seminars, is writing a full-length biography, and co-authored an eBook memoir with Irv Muchnick, Out of My Head; My Life In and Out of Football, which was published on January 30, 2012.

Outside the Lines featured Visger chronicling his life after football and getting through day-to-day routine after his nine brain surgeries. Visger is a well known advocate for all traumatic brain injury survivors and has presented at Congressional hearings on TBI, Brain Injury Association annual conferences, and coordinates with the California Community Colleges Disabled Student Program Services and Veterans Resource Centers.  Sacramento California for congressional hearing about traumatic brain injuries.

Visger is featured in Todd Trigsted’s upcoming movie, Gladiators: The Uncertain Future of American Football. Doug Cosbie (Dallas Cowboys 1979-1988) and associates began filming Visger’s autobiographic documentary An NFL Brain Injury and Recovery in April 2013.

Visger has spoken about his story and the TBI crisis in the NFL at numerous organizations nationwide including the Brain Rehabilitation And Injury Network (B.R.A.I.N.), a non-profit organization that advocates for adults with brain injuries.

References

External links 
 Official website
 The Damage Done - ESPN article about Visger's football injuries

1958 births
Living people
American football defensive linemen
Colorado Buffaloes football players
San Francisco 49ers players
Players of American football from Stockton, California
People with hydrocephalus
Concussion activists